Snejana "Snow" Urbin (born in Siberia, Russia) is a dancer and choreographer.

At the age of three, Urbin had begun attending dance classes with her mother guiding her. Urbin specialized in Latin and Ballroom, Rhythm and Smooth styles of dancing and began competing at the age of five.
Urbin won the Russian Juvenile Junior in Ballroom and Latin, after which she and her dance partner were invited to train in the U.S. for the Olympics.

In the U.S., she won the U.S. Youth Latin championship and competing in the Ohio State Ball, Manhattan Classic and Amateur Latin Championship. Urbin represented the United States at the World Latin DanceSport Championships on four occasions.

Urbin taught children in Rising Stars Academy, where she met Maksim Chmerkovskiy. The two became dance partners.
Since The 2007 Snow Urbin has been consulting for Arthur Murray Dance Schools

Urbin has appeared in music videos with Madonna and Shakira, Justin Timberlake

Snow Urbin appeared on Season 1 of Fox's  So You Think You Can Dance.  Urbin later appeared on ABC's Dancing With The Stars. 2013 Urbin choreographed for "Dancing With The Stars" in Panama .

Urbin is currently teaching in the United States and abroad.

Filmography
 Dancing with Chicago Celebrities (2009, 2010, 2011,2012,2013,3014,2016,2017,2018) .... Judge
 Academy Award (Oscars 2008) .... Dancer
 "Enchanted" (2007),Disney Films .... Dancer
 Good Morning America (ABC) .... Herself
 Biography of Igor and Snow Regional Broadcasting ("Yugra") Siberia .... Herself
 Ostankino (Moscow National Broadcasting Company) .... Herself
 Ohio Star Ball (PBS) .... Herself
 USA Dancesport Championship (Nostalgia Net) .... Herself
 "So You Think You Can Dance" .... Herself (6 episodes, 2005-2006)
 Dancing With the Stars (Pro Dancer Competition) ... Herself

Music videos
 Shakira & Wyclef Jean, Hips Don't Lie (Sony BMG Music Entertainment).
 Madonna, I'm Going To Tell You A Secret (Madonna/VH1).
 Justin Timberlake,  what goes around comes around

Stage
 Burn The Floor (lead dancer)
 Floor Play (Lead performer)  Atlantic City, NJ (2006)
 Underground (David Holls),  New York, NY (2004)
 Latin Fusion (2003)

External links
News & Information site

References
 New York Times 

Russian ballroom dancers
So You Think You Can Dance (American TV series) contestants
Living people
Russian female dancers
Year of birth missing (living people)
People from Siberia
21st-century American dancers
21st-century Russian dancers